The 2001 UCF Golden Knights football team represented the University of Central Florida in the 2001 NCAA Division I-A football season. Their head coach was Mike Kruczek, who was in his fourth season with the team. The season marked the Golden Knights last season as an independent. In 2002, UCF joined the Mid-American Conference in the East Division, the first conference for the Golden Knights since ascending to the Division I Football Bowl Subdivision in 1996.

On opening day, UCF traveled to No. 19 Clemson. The Tigers outlasted UCF, and won by the score of 21–13. UCF quarterback Ryan Schneider threw for 297 yards, but an ineffective rushing game was the difference in the game. UCF scored a touchdown with 8:09 left in regulation, but a missed extra point and a punt on their next possession allowed Clemson to run out the clock and preserve the win. On October 13, UCF blew out Liberty 63–0, the largest shutout victory in school history. The Golden Knights scored on their first six possessions, jumping out to a 42–0 halftime lead. In UCF's final game as an Independent school, the Golden Knights earned a 31–0 win over Louisiana–Lafayette in their second shutout of the year, and fourth blowout win since October. Finishing with a winning record of 6–5, UCF did not receive a bowl invitation.

Schedule

References

UCF
UCF Knights football seasons
UCF Golden Knights football